Lote Tuqiri (born 12 November 1987 in Namatakula, Fiji) is a Japan international rugby union sevens player.

He is a cousin of his dual-international namesake.

International
Tuqiri made his debut for Japan sevens in the 2011 Hong Kong Sevens.

Personal life 
He studied business management in Hakuoh University. After he graduated, he was employed in Hokkaido and started playing for the Hokkaido Barbarians mainly as a centre.

References

External links
 
 Japan RFU Player Profile
 
 
 

1987 births
Living people
People from Namatakula
Male rugby sevens players
Japanese rugby union players
Fijian rugby union players
People educated at Marist Brothers High School, Fiji
Fijian emigrants to Japan
Fijian expatriates in Japan
Rugby sevens players at the 2016 Summer Olympics
Olympic rugby sevens players of Japan
Japanese rugby sevens players
Kubota Spears Funabashi Tokyo Bay players
Japan international rugby sevens players
Rugby union players at the 2018 Asian Games
Asian Games silver medalists for Japan
Medalists at the 2018 Asian Games
Asian Games medalists in rugby union
Rugby sevens players at the 2020 Summer Olympics
Rugby union wings
Rugby union fullbacks
Rugby union centres
Hanazono Kintetsu Liners players